The Commitment is a 2014 Filipino film by director Joselito Altarejos. It was premiered as an entry to the Directors Showcase during the 10th Cinemalaya Philippine Independent Film Festival held in 2014. The film went on to win the Best Film title in the festival.

Synopsis
A Filipino gay couple are resolve to stay with each other. But things get complicated as they are invited to attend a wedding. It shows how a gay couple have to navigate difficult social norms. The film also questions the openness of Filipino society and its institutions.

Cast
Arnold Reyes		
Oliver Aquino		
Rita Avila		
Maureen Mauricio	
Rener Concepcion		
Ruby Ruiz		
Ronwaldo Martin
Chloe Carpio

Awards and nominations
The film was featured in the 2014 Cinemalaya Independent Film Festival where it won the Balanghai Trophy in four categories:
Best Film - Directors Showcase to director Joselito Altarejos for "its deeply sensitive and moving depiction of the intricacies of relationships".
Best Original Music Score to Richard Gonzales 
Best Production Design to Harley Alcasid 
Best Cinematography to Mycko David

During the Gawad Urian Awards in 2015, the lead actor Arnold Reyes was nominated for the "Best Actor" (Pinakamahusay na Pangunahing Aktor) category for his role in the film.

References

External links
Kasal Facebook page

2014 films
Philippine LGBT-related films
LGBT-related drama films
2014 LGBT-related films
Gay-related films